Dyckia martinellii is a plant species in the genus Dyckia.

The bromeliad is endemic to the Atlantic Forest biome (Mata Atlantica Brasileira) and within Rio de Janeiro state, located in southeast Brazil.

References

martinellii
Endemic flora of Brazil
Flora of the Atlantic Forest
Flora of Rio de Janeiro (state)
Plants described in 1990